Ohkiribata Dam  is an earthfill dam located in Kumamoto Prefecture in Japan. The dam is used for irrigation. The catchment area of the dam is 11.6 km2. The dam impounds about 9  ha of land when full and can store 851 thousand cubic meters of water. The construction of the dam was started on 1970 and completed in 1975.

See also
List of dams in Japan

References

Dams in Kumamoto Prefecture